Caroline Louise "Lyn" Ashton (born 29 November 1951 in Northampton, Massachusetts) is an American retired slalom canoeist who competed in the early and mid-1970s.

She won a gold medal in the K1 team event at the 1973 ICF Canoe Slalom World Championships in Muotathal. She also finished ninth in the K1 event at the 1972 Summer Olympics in Munich.

References

1951 births
American female canoeists
Canoeists at the 1972 Summer Olympics
Living people
Olympic canoeists of the United States
Medalists at the ICF Canoe Slalom World Championships
21st-century American women